Morton is an unincorporated community in Fremont County, Wyoming, United States.

References

Unincorporated communities in Wyoming
Unincorporated communities in Fremont County, Wyoming